The 43rd Saturn Awards, presented by the Academy of Science Fiction, Fantasy and Horror Films and honoring the best in science fiction, fantasy, horror, and other genres belonging to genre fiction in film, television, home media releases, and theatre in 2016 and early 2017, were held on June 28, 2017, in Burbank, California. A new category, Best Animated Series or Film on Television, was introduced. The show was hosted by Sean Gunn.

Nominations were announced on March 2, 2017. A Star Wars film led the nominations for the second year in a row, with Rogue One: A Star Wars Story earning eleven; it was followed by The BFG and Doctor Strange with ten, and Captain America: Civil War with eight. On television, The Walking Dead led the nominations for the third year in a row with seven, followed by newcomer Westworld with six. Doctor Strange director and co-writer Scott Derrickson, composer Michael Giacchino, and costume designer Colleen Atwood all earned two individual nominations.

In film, 10 Cloverfield Lane and Rogue One: A Star Wars Story earned the most wins with three, including Best Thriller Film and Best Science Fiction Film respectively; The BFG, Doctor Strange, and La La Land all scored two wins. On television, The Walking Dead won the most awards for the fourth year in a row with three wins including Best Horror Television Series, followed by Stranger Things, Supergirl, and Westworld, all with two. Candice Patton's Best Supporting Actress on Television win for The Flash also ended The Walking Deads record winning streak in that category.

Winners and nominees
Film

Television
Programs

Acting

Home Entertainment

Live Stage Production

Special Awards
 The Life Career Award – Lee Majors The Visionary Award – Akiva Goldsman The Filmmakers Showcase Award – Rick Jaffa and Amanda Silver The Breakthrough Performance Award – KJ Apa The Special Recognition Award – Heavy Metal (magazine)'''

Multiple nominations and wins

Film

The following works received multiple nominations:

11 nominations: Rogue One10 nominations: The BFG, Doctor Strange8 nominations: Captain America: Civil War7 nominations: Fantastic Beasts and Where to Find Them6 nominations: Arrival, The Jungle Book5 nominations: Passengers4 nominations: 10 Cloverfield Lane, Star Trek Beyond3 nominations: Deadpool, Gold, Suicide Squad, X-Men: Apocalypse2 nominations: Batman v Superman: Dawn of Justice, Ghostbusters, The Girl on the Train, The Handmaiden, Hell or High Water, Hidden Figures, Hunt for the Wilderpeople, La La Land, A Monster Calls, Split, Under the Shadow, The WitchThe following works received multiple wins:

3 wins: 10 Cloverfield Lane, Rogue One2 wins: The BFG, Doctor Strange, La La Land  

Television

The following works received multiple nominations:

7 nominations: The Walking Dead6 nominations: Westworld5 nominations: American Horror Story: Roanoke4 nominations: Fear the Walking Dead, Outlander, Supergirl3 nominations: Ash vs Evil Dead, Bates Motel, Game of Thrones, The Flash, Stranger Things, Teen Wolf2 nominations: Marvel's Daredevil, Marvel's Luke Cage, RiverdaleThe following works received multiple wins:

3 wins: The Walking Dead2 wins: Stranger Things, Supergirl, Westworld'', Riverdale

References

External links
 2017 nominations at Saturn Awards official website. Archived from the original on March 2, 2017.

Saturn Awards ceremonies
2017 film awards
2017 television awards
2017 in California
2017 in American cinema
2017 awards in the United States